Hamza Majed (born 8 February 1983) is a Tunisian handball player for Al Rayyan and the Tunisian national team.

References

1983 births
Living people
Tunisian male handball players